Prizren along with its historical values contributes to not only the city itself, but the entire territory of Kosovo.
Numerous data that have remained from the past suggest that this area has been inhabited since ancient times. Among the most valuable assets of Prizren are material values that are inherited from past centuries. Thanks to the suitable geographical position, Prizren is a woven together place where civilizations and different cultures meet. This list includes historical, cultural, religious and natural monuments of the municipality of Prizren, which are listed by the government of the Republic of Serbia, Republic of Kosovo, Municipality of Prizren, International NGOs and Local NGOs.

Culture monuments

Religious monuments

Mosques

Churches

Tekkes

Old houses

Natural monuments

Notes

References

Prizren
Prizren
Cultural heritage monuments in Prizren District